This page lists details of the consumer price index by country

Argentina

The CPI is calculated and posted monthly by the National Institute of Statistics and Census of Argentina.

Austria

Statistik Austria publishes the CPI for Austria.

Australia

The CPI is calculated and posted quarterly by the Australian Bureau of Statistics. Historical figures are available at the Reserve Bank of Australia website.

Belgium

In Belgium, wages, pensions, house rent, insurance premiums, unemployment benefits, health insurance payments, etc. are by law tied to a consumer price index.

Canada 

Canada's CPI is published by Statistics Canada. The index is calculated and published monthly. It is used to escalate a given dollar value, over time, to preserve the purchasing power of that value. Thus, the CPI is widely used to adjust contracted payments, such as wages, rents, leases and child or spousal support allowances. Private and public pension programs (Old Age Security and the Canada Pension Plan), personal income tax deductions, and some government social payments are also escalated using the CPI. It is also used to set and monitor the implementation of economic policy. The Bank of Canada, for example, uses the CPI, and special aggregates of the CPI, to monitor its monetary policies.

Chile

Chile's CPI is published by the Instituto Nacional de Estadística de Chile.

China
China's CPI is published by National Bureau of Statistics of China.

Hong Kong
Hong Kong's CPI is published by the Census and Statistics Department.

Colombia
The IPC, which stands for Indice de Precios al Consumidor (Consumer Price Index), is calculated and published on a monthly basis by Banco de la República de Colombia, the National Central Bank.

Croatia
Croatian CPI, (Croatian: Indeks potrošačkih cijena) is issued by Central Bureau of Statistics (Croatia).

Eurozone 

The European Central Bank publishes the Harmonized Index of Consumer Prices (HICP). It is a weighted average of price indices of member states. It is a seasonally adjusted chained index in which goods are split by final consumption.

Finland
The index (kuluttajahintaindeksi) is calculated and published by Statistics Finland
Finnish food prices have been increasing almost fastest in European Union. In the current year, consumer prices for food are forecast to increase by 4.5 per cent on average.
Most shopping centers have expensive underground car parking places that are often in practice free of charge. The high construction prices are included in the price of food and goods. The two biggest food retailers Kesko and S-Market (HOK Elanto) cover over 80% of the markets. Most often the town planning has ignored to plan new independent small shops. Satu Hassi (Green) has made a questionary for the EU Commission of the retail industry.

Germany

The index is calculated and published by the Federal Statistical Office of Germany (Statistisches Bundesamt), yearly and monthly results are available from 1991 onwards.

Greece 
The index is calculated and published by the Hellenic Statistical Authority, by using a variation of the Laspeures index. Until 2000, the index used to take into consideration only urban areas.

where

: the accuracy of decimal places

: the Consumer Price Index

: the number of products

: the -th product

: the year

: the month

: the weighting factor, where 

: the price of the -th product measured at the base year

: the quantity of the -th product measured at the base year

So:

: the CPI during this year, rounded at  decimal places

: the CPI in December of the previous year, rounded at  decimal places

: the individual index of the -th product, which can be derived from:

where , the population weighting factor

: the individual local price index of the -th product, which can be derived from:

where : the city

: the total of the cities used as samples for the CPI.

Iceland
The index is calculated and published by Statistics Iceland.

India
Wholesale Price Index (WPI)
WPI first published in 1902, and was one of the more economic indicators available to policy makers until it was replaced by most developed countries by the Consumer Price Index in the 1970s.
WPI is the index that is used to measure the change in the average price level of goods traded in wholesale market. In India, a total of 697 commodities data on price level is tracked through WPI which is an indicator of movement in prices of commodities in all trade and transactions. It is also the price index which is available on a weekly basis with the shortest possible time lag only two weeks.
Base year to calculate WPI is 2011-2012=100

Consumer Price Index (CPI) in India comprises multiple series classified based on different economic groups. There are four series, viz the CPI UNME (Urban Non-Manual Employee), CPI AL (Agricultural Labourer), CPI RL (Rural Labourer) and CPI IW (Industrial Worker). While the CPI UNME series is published by the Central Statistical Organisation, the others are published by the Department of Labour. From February 2011 the CPI (UNME) released by CSO is replaced as CPI (urban),CPI (rural) and CPI (combined).
Consumer Price Index is used in calculation of Dearness Allowance
which forms an integral part of salary of a Government Employee.Base year to calculate CPI is 2012=100.

Indonesia
Indeks Harga Konsumen (IHK) is calculated and published by Badan Pusat Statistik (BPS).

Iran
Iran's CPI is calculated by the Central Bank of Iran.

Ireland
Ireland's CPI is published by the Central Statistics Office Ireland.

Israel
Israeli's Central Bureau of Statistics publishes a series of consumer and other (manufacturing, agricultural, housing, etc.) price indices every month. Both current and historical data are available on their web site, which also includes a convenient calculator that allows visitors to enter starting and ending dates and retrieve the monthly data in HTML or Microsoft Excel spreadsheet format.

Italy
Italy's CPI is published by the Istat, the Italian national statistical institute.
Historical data and chart about inflation in Italy

Malaysia
Malaysia's CPI is computed and published by the Department of Statistics Malaysia on monthly basis.

Mexico
The INPC, which stands for Indice Nacional de Precios al Consumidor (Consumer Price Index in English), is calculated and published every two weeks or on a monthly basis by the National Institute on Statistics and Geography (INEGI). Until July 15, 2011, the INPC was published by Banco de México, the Central Bank.

Netherlands

Netherlands's CPI is calculated and published monthly by Statistics Netherlands.

New Zealand

The CPI of New Zealand is calculated and published quarterly by Statistics New Zealand from prices gathered in a range of surveys at 15 urban areas.

Nigeria
The CPI for Nigeria is calculated and published monthly by the National Bureau of Statistics (NBS).

Norway
Norway's CPI is calculated and published monthly by Statistics Norway.

Pakistan
Pakistan's CPI is published by Government of Pakistan Statistics Division, Federal Bureau of Statistics.

Poland
The index is calculated and published by GUS (Główny Urząd Statystyczny) page in English.

Sweden
The index is calculated and published by Statistics Sweden.

South Africa

The South African Reserve Bank sets interest rates based on CPI.

Switzerland
Switzerland issues a monthly CPI calculation by the Swiss Federal Statistical Office.

Taiwan
Taiwan's CPI is published by National Statistics, Republic of China (Taiwan).

Turkey

https://data.tuik.gov.tr/Bulten/Index?p=Consumer-Price-Index-September-2021-37387

United Kingdom 

The traditional measure of inflation in the UK for many years was the Retail Prices Index (the RPI), which was first calculated in the early 20th century to evaluate the extent to which workers were affected by price changes during the first world war. An explicit inflation target was first set in October 1992 by then-Chancellor of the Exchequer Norman Lamont following the departure of the UK from the Exchange Rate Mechanism. Initially, the target was based on the RPIX, which is the RPI calculated excluding mortgage interest payments. This was felt to be a better measure of the effectiveness of macroeconomic policy. It was argued that if interest rates are used to curb inflation, then including mortgage payments in the inflation measure would be misleading. Until 1997, interest rates were set by the Treasury.

On winning power in May 1997, the New Labour government handed control over interest rates to the Bank of England, whose Monetary Policy Committee now sets rates on the basis of an inflation target set by the Chancellor. If in any month inflation is more than one percentage point off its target, the Governor of the Bank of England is required to write to the Chancellor explaining why. Mervyn King became the first Governor to do so in April 2007, when inflation ran at 3.1% against a target 2%.

Since 1996 the United Kingdom has also tracked a Consumer Price Index figure, and in December 2003 its inflation target was changed to one based on the CPI. The CPI target is currently 2%. Both the CPI and the RPI are published monthly by the Office for National Statistics.

United States

In the US, CPI figures are prepared monthly by the Bureau of Labor Statistics of the United States Department of Labor.

The CPI-U includes expenditures by all urban consumers. The CPI-W includes expenditures by consumer units with clerical workers, sales workers, craft workers, operative, service workers, or laborers. Recently, the Chained Consumer Price Index C-CPI-U, a chained index, was introduced. The C-CPI-U tries to mitigate the substitution bias that is encountered in CPI-W and CPI-U by employing a Tornqvist formula and utilizing expenditure data in adjacent time periods in order to reflect the effect of any substitution that consumers make across item categories in response to changes in relative prices. The new measure, called a "superlative" index, is designed to be a closer approximation to a "cost-of-living" index than the other measures. The use of expenditure data for both a base period and the current period in order to average price change across item categories distinguishes the C-CPI-U from the existing CPI measures, which use only a single expenditure base period to compute the price change over time. In 1999, the BLS introduced a geometric mean estimator for averaging prices within most of the index's item categories in order to approximate the effect of consumers' responses to changes in relative prices within these item categories. The geometric mean estimator is used in the C-CPI-U in the same item categories in which it is now used in the CPI-U and CPI-W.

The CPI has powerful political ramifications, and administrations of both parties have been tempted to change the basis for its calculation.  Especially since 1980, the definition of CPI has been altered repeatedly, though economists disagree whether the index underestimates or overestimates the true rate of decline in purchasing power.

Major research in progress 
 Continuing research on technical improvements in the calculation of the CPI.
 Continuing work on the next major weight revision of the CPI.

In 1996, the Boskin Commission found the CPI to be a biased measure, and gave a quantitative analysis of the bias. The Boskin critique helped to spur some changes in the U.S. CPI, although it was partially disputed by the BLS. Many of the changes were aimed at moving the CPI to a cost of living model which takes consumer substitutions into account and typically reduces the reported level of inflation.

Vietnam
Vietnam's CPI is computed and published by the General Statistics Office of Vietnam.

Zimbabwe

As of July 2008 the official CPI as set by the Reserve Bank of Zimbabwe is 35.  This is up from a low of 30 in 1990 and an increase of about 3.5% over the figure for January 2008.

References

Price indices